Geraint Lewis (born 12 January 1974) is a former Wales international rugby union player.

A back row forward, he played club rugby for Pontypridd RFC, Rotherham Titans, Bristol and Bath before returning to Pontypridd at the start of the 2007/08 season.

Geraint departed Pontypridd, and retired from Premiership Rugby, in the 2009 close season to take up the reins of player/coach at WRU Division 2 East's Llantwit Fardre RFC.

References

1974 births
Living people
Rugby union players from Pontypridd
Pontypridd RFC players
Rotherham Titans players
Wales international rugby union players
Welsh rugby union players